Zari is a thread made of fine gold or silver.

Zari may refer to:

Location 
 Zari District, a district in Balkh Province, Afghanistan
 Zari, Palghar, a village in Maharashtra India
 Zari, Parbhani, a village in Maharashtra, India
 Zari, Tibet, a village in Tibet
 Zari, Iran, a village in Iran
 Zari Hassan, a Ugandan performing artist and businesswoman

Television 
 Zari Tomaz, a character in the TV series Legends of Tomorrow
 "Zari" (Legends of Tomorrow episode)